John Derek Yancey (born October 13, 1986), better known by his stage name Illa J, is an American rapper, singer, producer and songwriter. from Detroit, Michigan who has released two albums on Delicious Vinyl Records. He is the younger brother of the late hip hop producer, and rapper J Dilla, and a former member of hip hop group Slum Village. He also released a collaborative album as Yancey Boys along with Frank Nitt. Illa J's second solo album ILLA J  came out via the Brooklyn based record label, Bastard Jazz.

Early life
Illa J grew up in a musical family. He is the younger brother of J Dilla, and is the son of Maureen Yancey, a former opera singer, and a former jazz bassist. John Yancey was the youngest of four children including a sister (Martha) and two brothers (Earl and James). The family lived in a house near McDougall and Nevada, on the east side of Detroit. According to Slum Village founding member T3, before getting into music Illa J's main focus was basketball. In 2006, after the death of his brother, he decided to drop out of Central Michigan University, and continue the family's involvement with music.

Career
In 2008, he released his debut album, Yancey Boys on Delicious Vinyl Records. It is produced entirely by previously unused beats that were made by J Dilla and were left sitting at the offices of Delicious Vinyl over several years. Stones Throw Records released a digital instrumental version of the album in 2009. In the following year (2010), he quietly released a second EP entitled, 4 Past Midnite. In the year 2013, he followed with the album Evolution as Slum Village along with rapper T3 and producer Young RJ, and a collaborative album with Frank Nitt, entitled Sunset Blvd. In 2015, he released ILLA J on Bastard Jazz Records.

Discography

Studio albums
 2008: Yancey Boys
 2015: ILLA J
 2017: Home
 2018: John Yancey

Collaborative albums
 2013: Evolution (with T3 & Young RJ as Slum Village)
 2013: Sunset Blvd. (with Frank Nitt as Yancey Boys)
 2015: YES (with T3 & Young RJ as Slum Village)

EPs
 2007: Illa J EP 
 2010: 4 Past Midnite

Mixtapes
 2012: Dirty Slums (with T3 & Young RJ as Slum Village)
 2013: Dirty Slums 2  (with T3 & Young RJ as Slum Village)

Singles
 2008: "We Here"
 2009: "Sound Like Love" (featuring Debi Nova)
 2010: "Affair"
 2012: "The Throwaway"  (featuring Frank Nitt)
 2013: "Quicksand" (Yancey Boys featuring Common and Dezi Paige)
 2015: "Strippers"
 2015: "Universe"
 2015: "All Good Pt. 2"  (featuring Moka Only & Ivan Ave)
 2018: Enjoy the Ride

Guest appearances
 Bishop Lamont & Black Milk – "Spectacular" from Caltroit (2007)
 J Dilla – "See That Boy Fly" from Jay Stay Paid (2009)
 Focus... – "Homage to Dilla" from Pay Homage series (2009)
 Grynch – "You Know Me (Remix)" from Chemistry 1.5 (2009)<ref>{{cite web|title=iTunes – Music – Chemistry 1.5' by Grynch|url=https://itunes.apple.com/ca/album/chemistry-1.5/id329477629|publisher=iTunes|access-date=November 7, 2013|date=October 6, 2009}}</ref>
 Roc C – "Turn It Up" (2010)
 Slum Village – "The Reunion, Pt. 2" from Villa Manifesto (2010)
 Cris Prolific – "Voyage" from Art/Money Vol. 1 (2011)
 Jonti – "The Days Have Turned" (2011)
 J Dilla – "Do It for Dilla Dawg" from Rebirth of Detroit (2012)
 Slum Village – "Greatness", "Nightmares (No Mas)", "Look at Yo Face", "How It Feel", "What You Want", "Un Fuc Witable" from Dirty Slums 2 (2013)
 Jonti – "Home" (2013)
 Potatohead People – "Explosives" from Explosives feat. Illa J & Moka Only / Blue Charms (2014)
 Potatohead People – "Seeds" from Big Luxury (2015)
 Phife Dawg – "French Kiss Trois" from Forever'' (2022)

References

External links
 Official website
 Illa J's Official Soundcloud

1986 births
Living people
American hip hop record producers
African-American male rappers
Rappers from Detroit
Midwest hip hop musicians
American hip hop singers
21st-century American rappers
21st-century American male musicians
Slum Village members
21st-century African-American musicians
20th-century African-American people